John Richard Williams may refer to:

 John Richard Williams (poet) (1867–1924), Welsh-language lyrical poet
 John Richard Williams (politician) or Jack Williams (1909–1998), American radio announcer and politician
 John Richard Williams (priest) (born 1948), Anglican priest

See also 
 John Williams (disambiguation)
 John R. Williams (disambiguation)